Francis Wing may refer to:
 Francis Joseph Wing, American judge
 Francis L. Wing, mayor of Tampa, Florida